Sunny Michaela Sweeney (born December 7, 1976) is an American country music singer and songwriter. She is signed to the Thirty Tigers label.  She was formerly with the Republic Nashville label and Big Machine Records. Her debut album, Heartbreaker's Hall of Fame, was independently issued in 2006 and then regionally released in 2007.  It produced three regional (Texas, Oklahoma) singles in "If I Could", "Ten Years Pass" and "East Texas Pines", and these songs charted on the Texas Music Chart. In June 2010, the lead-off to her second studio album, "From a Table Away," became her first single to chart.

Biography

Sweeney was born in Houston, Texas. Initially, Sweeney lived in Austin, TX, and went to Southwest Texas State University.  She moved to New York City to take a break from school.  Once ready to face school again, she returned to Texas and got a degree in Public Relations from SWT.

After college, she started a band and played local bars in Austin and began to branch out and play around Texas.  She put out her first album with the production help of Tommy Detamore in March 2006. After gaining a following on the club circuit in her native Texas, Sweeney signed to the independent Big Machine Records label. She also toured throughout Europe in 2007. Her debut album, Heartbreaker's Hall of Fame, was initially self-released in March 2006, and was reissued in March 2007 on Big Machine.

In 2009, Sweeney was signed as the first artist to Republic Nashville, a newly founded joint venture between Big Machine and Universal Republic Records. Her first single for the label is "From a Table Away," which was released on June 28, 2010. It became her first chart single when it debuted at No. 58 on the U.S. Billboard Hot Country Songs chart for the week of June 26, 2010. In March 2011, the song entered the Top 10 of the chart.

Republic Nashville released Sweeney's second studio album, Concrete on August 23, 2011. The album was produced by Brett Beavers consists of ten tracks, including one co-written with Radney Foster and Jay Clementi. "Staying's Worse Than Leaving" and "Drink Myself Single" were released as the album's second and third singles, respectively, and both were minor Top 40 hits on the Hot Country Songs chart. Sweeney and Big Machine parted ways in 2012.

In 2013, Sweeney signed a recording contract with the Thirty Tigers record label. Her debut label single entitled "Bad Girl Phase" was released in June 2014. Through the fan-sponsored PledgeMusic program, Sweeney issued her third studio record, Provoked, on August 5, 2014. "My Bed," a duet with Will Hoge, was released in early 2015 as the album's second single.

Dreamer: A Tribute to Kent Finlay, released in early 2016 on Austin-based Eight 30 Records, features Sweeney and Randy Rogers' duet "Between You and Me."

Sweeney's fourth studio album, Trophy, was released on March 10, 2017.

Sweeney released her first live album, Recorded Live At The Machine Shop Recording Studio, on November 13, 2020.

Sweeney’s fifth studio album, Married Alone, was released on September 23, 2022. It includes a duet with Vince Gill on the title track as well as vocals from Paul Cauthen on “A Song Can’t Fix Everything”.

Discography

Studio albums

Live albums

Extended plays

Singles

Music videos

Notes

Awards and nominations

References

External links

Official Website

American women country singers
American country singer-songwriters
Living people
Singer-songwriters from Texas
Big Machine Records artists
Country musicians from Texas
Republic Records artists
Texas State University alumni
1976 births
21st-century American singers
21st-century American women singers
Thirty Tigers artists